The 2011 Dayton Dutch Lions season was the club's second season of existence, and their first season in USL Pro, the third division of American soccer.

Background 

The Dutch Lions' inaugural season was spent playing in the Premier Development League, the fourth-tier of the American soccer pyramid. During their campaign, the Lions finished in third place in the Great Lakes Division and in the Central Conference.

In spite of their third-place finish, the Dutch Lions' 29 points and 8-3-5 record was not enough to qualify for the PDL Playoffs, falling short to Forest City London by six points.

Review

Roster

First team 
As of June 26, 2011

Academy

Club

Management 
  Ivar van Dinteren - Head Coach
  Jack Hermans - Assistant Coach
  Cor van Hoeven - Technical Director
  Zach Huffman - General Manager (USA)
  Warner van Hattem - General Manager (Netherlands)

Transfers

In

Out

Standings 
National Division

Match results

Preseason

USL Pro

U.S. Open Cup

Statistics

Appearances and goals 
Last updated on 26 January 2011.

References 

2011
American soccer clubs 2011 season
2011 USL Pro season
2011 in sports in Ohio